Charles Rozell Swindoll  (born October 18, 1934) is an evangelical Christian pastor, author, educator, and radio preacher. He founded Insight for Living, headquartered in Frisco, Texas, which airs a radio program of the same name on more than 2,000 stations around the world in 15 languages. He is currently senior pastor at Stonebriar Community Church, in Frisco, Texas.

Early life
Charles Rozell Swindoll was born on October 18, 1934, in El Campo in Wharton County, Texas, the third of three children born to Earl and Lovell Swindoll. He attended Charles H. Milby High School in Houston. He credits his drama teacher, Dick Nieme, for helping him manage his stutter. As a member of the school marching band and orchestra, he learned to play all of the instruments in the woodwind section, although the clarinet remained his primary instrument. After graduating from high school, he studied mechanical engineering while working for Reed Roller Bit Company in Houston, Texas. Swindoll then fulfilled his military service obligation with the United States Marine Corps, first in San Francisco, then on the Japanese island of Okinawa. Part of his duty included playing in the Marine Corps Marching Band.

After his honorable discharge in 1959, he attended Dallas Theological Seminary, where he graduated magna cum laude four years later.

Career
Swindoll was ordained into the ministry in 1963 and served in Dallas, under J. Dwight Pentecost, for two years. He has since held senior pastorates in Waltham, Massachusetts (1965–67), Irving, Texas (1967–71), and Fullerton, California (1971–94). He started his current senior pastorate in Frisco, Texas in 1998.

Swindoll is the founder of Insight for Living, which produces a radio program of the same name on Christian and non-Christian radio stations around the world. The program is heard on more than 2000 stations, as well as being webcast, and is translated into several languages. Its roots go back to the summer of 1977, when Swindoll's sermons from the First Evangelical Free Church in Fullerton were broadcast on radio. In 1979 the Insight for Living radio ministry began; its offices are now located in Frisco.

In July 1994, Swindoll became the president of Dallas Theological Seminary and now serves as its chancellor. He is the author of more than 70 books, most of which are based on his research and preparation for sermons preached each Sunday. In celebration of its 50th anniversary, Christianity Today produced an article naming Swindoll as one of the top 25 most influential preachers of the past 50 years (1956–2006).

In 1998 Swindoll founded Stonebriar Community Church in Frisco. Many of the pastors at Stonebriar are graduates of Dallas Theological Seminary. The church first held services at Collin County Community College (now Collin College), then moved to its permanent home on Legendary Drive. The congregation grew rapidly from a few hundred members to several thousand in the first few years, and this growth has necessitated major expansion of the current facility. Construction for the additions began in 2005. The church is known for its missionary work in India and in other countries. Though Swindoll is still widely regarded as an Evangelical Free Church of America preacher, the Stonebriar Community Church is not affiliated with any particular denomination.

Personal life
On June 18, 1955, Swindoll married Cynthia Ann Parker, who used to be the pianist at a Baptist Church in Galena Park, Texas. Together, the couple has four children, ten grandchildren and seven great-grandchildren.

Selected publications
 Hand Me Another Brick, Thomas Nelson (1978)
 You And Your Child, Thomas Nelson (1977)
 Three Steps Forward, Two Steps Back: Persevering Through Pressure, Thomas Nelson (1980)
 Strike The Original Match,  Multnomah (1980)
 Improving Your Serve: The Art Of Unselfish Living, Word (1981)
 Strengthening Your Grip: Essentials In An Aimless World, Word (1982)
 Growing Strong in the Seasons of Life, Multnomah (1983)
 Dropping Your Guard: The Value Of Open Relationships, Word (1983)
 Come Before Winter – And Share My Hope, Multnomah (1985)
 Living on the Ragged Edge: Coming To Terms With Reality, Word (1985)
 Growing Deep In The Christian Life: Returning To Our Roots, Multnomah (1986)
 The Quest For Character,  Multnomah (1987)
 Living Above The Level of Mediocrity : A Commitment To Excellence, Word (1987)
 Growing Wise in Family Life, Multnomah (1988)
 Living Beyond The Daily Grind: Reflections On The Songs And Sayings In Scripture, Word (1988)
 Rise & Shine: A Wake-Up Call,  Multnomah (1989)
 The Grace Awakening,  Word (1990)
 Sanctity Of Life: The Inescapable Issue, Word (1990)
 Stress Fractures,  Multnomah (1990)
 Simple Faith, Word (1991)
 Laugh Again, Word (1992)
 Flying Closer to the Flame, Word (1993)
 The Finishing Touch, Word (1994)
 Paw Paw Chuck's Big Ideas in the Bible, Word (1995)
 Hope Again, Word (1996)
 The Road To Armageddon (with John F Walvoord; J Dwight Pentecost), Word (1999)
 Start Where You Are: Catch A Fresh Vision For Your Life, Word (1999)
 The Mystery Of God's Will: What Does He Want For Me?, Word (1999)
 Intimacy With The Almighty, Word Publishing (1996)
 Perfect Trust: Ears To Hear, Hearts To Trust, And Minds To Rest In Him, J. Countryman (2000)
 The Darkness And The Dawn : Empowered By The Tragedy And Triumph Of The Cross, Word (2001)
 Why, God?: Calming Words For Chaotic Times, Word (2001)
 Wisdom For The Way: Wise Words For Busy People, J. Countryman (2001)
 Understanding Christian Theology (with Roy B. Zuck), Thomas Nelson (2003)
 Behold—The Man!: The Pathway Of His Passion, Word (2004)
 So, You Want To Be Like Christ?: Eight Essentials To Get You There, Word (2005)
 When God Is Silent (Choosing To Trust In Life's Trials), J. Countryman (2005)
 Great Attitudes For Graduates!: 10 Choices For Success In Life (with Terri A. Gibbs), J. Countryman (2006)
 Encouragement For Life: Words Of Hope And Inspiration, J. Countryman (2006) 
 The Strength Of Character: 7 Essential Traits Of A Remarkable Life (with Terri A. Gibbs), J. Countryman (2007) 
 A Bethlehem Christmas: Celebrating The Joyful Season, Thomas Nelson (2007) 
 The Owner's Manual for Christians: The Essential Guide for a God-Honoring Life, Thomas Nelson (2009) 
 The Church Awakening: An Urgent Call for Renewal, FaithWords (2010) 
 Living the Psalms, Worthy Publishing (2012) 
 Living the Proverbs, Worthy Publishing (2012) 
 Hear Me When I Call: Learning to Connect with a God Who Cares, Worthy Publishing (2013) 
 Embraced By The Spirit: The Untold Blessings of Intimacy With God, Worthy Publishing (2013) 
 The Swindoll Study Bible, Tyndale House Publishers, Inc. (2017)

Swindoll's New Testament Insights Commentary Series
 Insights on Romans, Zondervan (2010) 
 Insights on John, Zondervan (2010) 
 Insights on James and 1 & 2 Peter, Zondervan (2010) 
 Insights on 1 & 2 Timothy and Titus, Zondervan (2011) 
 Insights on Revelation, Zondervan (2012)
 Insights on Luke, Zondervan (2012)

Profiles in Character series
 David: A Man Of Passion & Destiny, Word (1997) 
 Esther: A Woman Of Strength & Dignity, Word (1997) 
 Joseph: A Man Of Integrity And Forgiveness, Word (1998) 
 Moses: A Man Of Selfless Dedication, Word (1999) 
 Elijah: A Man Of Heroism And Humility, Word (2000) 
 Paul: A Man Of Grace And Grit, Word (2002) 
 Job: A Man Of Heroic Endurance, Word (2004) 
 Fascinating Stories of Forgotten Lives : Rediscovering Some Old Testament Characters, Word (2005) 
 Jesus: The Greatest Life Of All,  Thomas Nelson (2008) 
 Abraham: One Nomad's Amazing Journey of Faith, Tyndale House (2014)

Honors and awards
 Harry A. Ironside Award for Expository Preaching – Dallas Theological Seminary, 1963
 Christian Education Award – Dallas Theological Seminary, 1963
 Faculty Award – Dallas Theological Seminary, 1963
 Doctor of Divinity – Talbot School of Theology, 1977
 Doctor of Human Letters – Taylor University, 1986
 Clergyman of the Year – Religious Heritage of America, 1988
 Doctor of Laws – Pepperdine University, 1990
 Doctor of Literature – Dallas Baptist University, 1998
 Lifetime Achievement Award – Catalyst Conference, 2009

See also
 Paws and Tales

References

External links
 Insight for Living – Official Web Site
 Stonebriar Community Church – Official Web Site

1934 births
Living people
20th-century American male writers
20th-century American non-fiction writers
20th-century evangelicals
21st-century American male writers
21st-century American non-fiction writers
21st-century evangelicals
American Christian religious leaders
American evangelicals
American male non-fiction writers
American radio personalities
American sermon writers
Christians from Texas
Dallas Theological Seminary alumni
Members of the Evangelical Free Church of America
People from El Campo, Texas
People from Irving, Texas
People from Plano, Texas
United States Marines